The Ural Ocean (also called the Uralic Ocean) was a small, ancient ocean that was situated between Siberia and Baltica. The ocean formed in the Late Ordovician epoch, when large islands from Siberia collided with Baltica, which was then part of the landmass Euramerica. The islands also caused Ural Ocean's precursor, Khanty Ocean to close. By the Devonian Period, however, Ural Ocean begins to shrink because the Siberian continent and Kazakhstania microcontinent were closing in to Baltica. In the Latest Devonian to Mississippian periods, Ural Ocean became a seaway. Until the three collided in the Carboniferous, it created the Ural Mountains, completely closing the ocean, and forming the Pangaea supercontinent.

See also

References 

Historical oceans
Ordovician paleogeography
Silurian bodies of water
Devonian paleogeography
Carboniferous paleogeography
Natural history of Europe
Natural history of Asia